Albert Einstein has been the subject of, or inspiration for, many works of popular culture.

On Einstein's 72nd birthday on March 14, 1951, United Press photographer Arthur Sasse was trying to persuade him to smile for the camera, but having smiled for photographers many times that day, Einstein stuck out his tongue instead. This photograph became one of the most popular ever taken of Einstein, often used in merchandise depicting him in a lighthearted sense. Einstein enjoyed this photo and requested UPI to give him nine copies for personal use, one of which he signed for a reporter. On June 19, 2009, the original signed photograph was sold at auction for $74,324, a record for an Einstein picture.

Einstein is a favorite model for depictions of absent-minded professors; his expressive face and distinctive hairstyles have been widely copied and exaggerated. Time magazine's Frederic Golden wrote that Einstein was "a cartoonist's dream come true."

"Einstein" has become a byword for an extremely intelligent person. It may also be used sarcastically when someone states the obvious or demonstrates a lack of wisdom or intelligence (as in "Way to go, Einstein!")

Many quotes that have become popular via the Internet have been misattributed to him, including "The definition of insanity is doing the same thing over and over and expecting a different result".

Recognition
In 1999, leading physicists voted Einstein the "greatest physicist ever".

His birthday, March 14, is also Pi Day, so called because 3/14 (March 14 in shorthand month-day format) corresponds to 3.14, the first three digits of the number Pi. The town of Princeton, New Jersey, where Einstein lived for more than 20 years, celebrates March 14 every year as "Princeton Pi Day and Einstein Birthday Party."

Usage of his name and image
The children's television show Little Einsteins and the educational toys and videos of the Baby Einstein series both use Einstein's name, though not his image.

Iranian cartoonist and humorist Javad Alizadeh publishes a column titled "4D Humor" in his Persian monthly Humor & Caricature, which features cartoons, caricatures and stories on Einstein-related topics. In 1991 he published in Persian "4D Humor", a comic book on Einstein's life and work, inspired mainly by the Theory of Relativity.

Licensing
Einstein bequeathed his estate, as well as the use of his image (see personality rights), to the Hebrew University of Jerusalem, which from the mid-1980s has sponsored the Einstein Papers Project with the Princeton University Press. Einstein actively supported the university during his life and this support continues with the royalties received from licensing activities. GreenLight licences the commercial use of the name "Albert Einstein" and associated imagery and likenesses of Einstein, as agent for the Hebrew University of Jerusalem. As head licensee, the corporation can control commercial usage of Einstein's name and theoretically ensure compliance with certain standards (e.g., when Einstein's name is used as a trademark, the ™ symbol must be used).

In 2012 Judge Howard Matz of a United States district court found that although a General Motors advertisement featuring Einstein's image was “tasteless” it was not illegal. Judge Matz wrote, “the obviously humorous ad for the 2010 Terrain having been published 55 years or more after Einstein's death, it is unlikely that any viewer of it could reasonably infer that Einstein, or whoever succeeded to any right of publicity that Einstein may have had, was endorsing the GMC Terrain.”

Hebrew University asked that publicity rights be extended to the 70 years associated with copyright protection. Judge Matz declined, stating “the Ninth Circuit recently noted that Marilyn Monroe considered herself to belong 'to the Public and to the world,’ ” Matz wrote. “There is no evidence that Albert Einstein saw himself that way, but he did become the symbol and embodiment of genius. His persona has become thoroughly ingrained in our cultural heritage. Now, nearly 60 years after his death, that persona should be freely available to those who seek to appropriate it as part of their own expression, even in tasteless ads.”

Handedness
There is a persistent popular belief that Einstein was left-handed, but there is no evidence that he was, and the belief has been called a myth. Einstein wrote with his right hand, and authoritative sources state flatly that he was right-handed. An autopsy on Einstein's brain showed a symmetry between the two hemispheres, rather than a left-sided dominance as is typical of most right-handed people or a right-sided dominance as found in most left-handed people.

Educational institutions

Several schools, colleges, and universities are named after Einstein, including in Germany, Honduras, and the United States.

In media and drama

Stage
Einstein has been the subject of or inspiration for many novels, films and plays, such as Steve Martin's comedic play Picasso at the Lapin Agile. He was the subject of Paul Dessau's 1974 opera Einstein and in 1976 in Philip Glass's opera Einstein on the Beach, and his humorous side is the subject of Ed Metzger's one-man play Albert Einstein: The Practical Bohemian. He features prominently in Daniel Kehlmann's play about Kurt Gödel, Ghosts in Princeton (2011).

Film
Einstein was portrayed by Ludwig Stössel in the 1947 film The Beginning or the End.

He was the subject (along with Arthur Eddington) of the BBC Two film Einstein and Eddington, featuring David Tennant as Eddington and Andy Serkis as Einstein, and detailing Einstein's development of his theories and Eddington's attempts to prove them and in Yahoo Serious's intentionally inaccurate biography of Einstein as an Australian in the film Young Einstein, although the movie is fictionalized.

An Einstein-like character appears in Nicolas Roeg's 1985 film Insignificance. Set in New York in 1953, the film includes a scene in which "The Professor" (played by Michael Emil), the character evidently representing Albert Einstein, discusses Relativity with "The Actress" (Theresa Russell), a Marilyn Monroe-like character.

Einstein was portrayed by Walter Matthau in the 1994 romantic comedy I.Q.

In the 2001 film A.I.: Artificial Intelligence, he was portrayed as a holographic personality called Dr. Know (voiced by Robin Williams).

In the film Night at the Museum: Battle of the Smithsonian, he and the other bobbleheads live in the Air and Space Museum.

The 2009 film The Nutcracker in 3D includes a character named Uncle Albert (played by Nathan Lane) who resembles Einstein, speaks with a German accent, and recites Albert Einstein quotes, but is never explicitly identified as Einstein.

The Star Wars character Yoda's wrinkles were modeled after Einstein's, to give the impression of exceptional intelligence.

In the movie Back to the Future, the character of Dr. Emmett 'Doc' Brown, played by actor Christopher Lloyd and portrayed as a brilliant scientist, time traveler and inventor, has a dog called "Einstein", named after Brown's favorite scientist, as well as bearing a superficial resemblance to him. Lloyd also credited Einstein as being his inspiration for the character.

In the 2011 film, Transformers: Dark of the Moon, the Autobot character known as Que sports an Einstein-inspired head design, including his wild hairstyle, dapper mustache, and eyes. However, his accent is often confused for being German because of these similarities. Like his G1 counterpart and Einstein alike, he is one of the most intelligent members of his team, and is an accomplished scientist and inventor. However, his onscreen name "Que" was derived from Professor Q, a James Bond character, who also inspired Wheeljack/Que's overall character.

Einstein was portrayed by David Shackleton in the 2018 comedy Holmes & Watson.

Television

A holographic representation of Einstein, played by Jim Norton, appeared in two episodes of Star Trek: The Next Generation. He first appears to debate physics with Reginald Barclay in "The Nth Degree". Norton returns in the first part of "Descent". The episode starts on the Enterprise with a game of poker being played by holodeck representations of Einstein, Sir Isaac Newton, and Stephen Hawking (portrayed by himself). All are programmed by Lt. Commander Data, playing as the fourth person in the game.

In the Cartoon series Dexter's Laboratory Boy genius Dexter's hero is Albert Einstein

In the television series Voyagers!, in an episode titled, "The Travels of Marco...and Friends", the story begins with Bogg and Jeff landing in New York, 1930, and saving Einstein from a potentially-fatal accident.

In the television series The Super Mario Bros. Super Show, Einstein was played by Ed Metzger.

In the television series Touched by an Angel, Einstein was played by Harold Gould.

In the television series Eureka, the town of Eureka was established when President Harry S. Truman commissioned development of a top-secret lab, staffed by Albert Einstein, after World War II and it became home to the scientists and their families working there.

In the Rick and Morty episode, "A Rickle in Time", time-traveling monsters beat up Einstein, whom they had mistaken for Rick Sanchez.

Einstein is portrayed in the 2017 National Geographic period drama television series, Genius, by Geoffrey Rush and Johnny Flynn, as the elder and younger Einstein, respectively.

Einstein is portrayed in DC's Legends of Tomorrow by John Rubinstein in the episode "Out of Time" and was mentioned later in "The Curse of the Earth Totem" when he trapped in the ice age due to being displaced.

German Netflix series Dark begins a with a quote about the perception of time by Einstein.

Web series
He is one of the main characters in the web series Super Science Friends.

Other
The infant multimedia franchise Baby Einstein was named after him. The franchise includes direct-to-video programs, CDs, books, flashcards, toys, and baby gear that specialize in interactive activities for infants and toddlers, created by Julie Aigner-Clark.

The videos show babies and toddlers under four years simple patterns, puppet shows, and familiar objects, such as everyday items, animals, and toys that are often accompanied by reorchestrated classical music written by composers such as Johann Sebastian Bach, Ludwig van Beethoven, Wolfgang Amadeus Mozart, and many others, as well as some traditional rhymes constructed for an easy, relaxing way, meant for a baby's ear.

The puppets are all animals who seldom speak, mostly communicating in simple sounds and their respective animal sounds.

Baby Einstein was introduced to the public on June 4, 1996, and remained a small company until Clark sold it to Disney.

In literature
Featured in Jean-Claude Carrière's 2005 French novel, Einstein S'il Vous Plaît (Einstein If You Please) where Carrière portrays a fictional conversation between Einstein and a student.

Alan Lightman's first book Einstein's Dreams, consists of short stories which are portrayed as being the dreams of Einstein while he was working on the theory of relativity; these stories explain how time would work in imaginary parallel universes.

Novelist Jacob M. Appel's Einstein's Beach House relates a fictional battle over the settlement of Einstein's estate after his death.

David Bodanis's book E=mc2: A Biography of the World's Most Famous Equation is a biography of Einstein's famous equation and the other scientists before during and after his time that contributed to the understanding we have about the equation.

In James Dashner's young adult novels, The Maze Runner, one of the main characters of the first novel (Alby) is said to be named after him.

Marie Hermanson's Swedish crime novel Den stora utställningen (The Great Exhibition) is set during the 1923 Gothenburg Exhibition where Einstein held his official Nobel Lecture after being awarded the 1921 Nobel Prize in Physics. In this fictional version of events, Einstein is the intended victim of an antisemitic murder plot and one of the viewpoint characters.

The manga series Dr. Stone features the main character, Senku Ishigami in chapter 93 recreating the same famous picture of Einstein when photography is reintroduced into the world.

The manga series One Piece introduced a scientist by the name of Dr. Vegapunk in chapter 433, released in November 2006. Despite being a major influence on the world and plot of the series, his actual appearance was only revealed in chapter 1066, released 16 years later in November 2022. With his gray hair, mustache and a large tongue, he bears a striking resemblance to Albert Einstein on the 1951 photo.

In visual arts

In 1940, Philadelphia artist Louis Hirshman did a caricature of Einstein using found objects, including a wild mop of hair, an abacus chest and shirt collar scribbled with the equation 2+2 = 2+2. In 1977, the piece was purchased by the Philadelphia Museum of Art.

In the manga and anime series Dr. Stone, the main character Senku Ishigami has hair resembling Einstein's, wears a robe with E=mc² written on it, and imitates the famous "tongue out" photo of Einstein (seen at the top of this page) for the first photograph taken with a reinvented camera.

In the manga and anime series One Piece, world renowned scientist, Dr. Vegapunk's design is inspired by Albert Einstein's appearance and is seen with his tongue sticking out which references the "tongue out" photo.

In music
Einstein is one of the celebrities on the cover of the Beatles' Sgt. Pepper's Lonely Hearts Club Band.
The Moody Blues include his likeness on the cover of A Question of Balance, released in 1970.
Bob Dylan pays a tribute to him in a verse in "Desolation Row".
Mariah Carey's eleventh studio album is entitled E=MC2 after Einstein's celebrated equation.
Big Audio Dynamite featured a song titled E=MC2 on their first album This is Big Audio Dynamite.
Carolina Crown Drum and Bugle Corps 2013 show was titled "E=MC2", and won 1st place in the 2013 DCI World Class Championship.
Kelly Clarkson's 2011 song "Einstein" is named after him.
Greek singer Giorgos Lembesis has released a song titled "Einstein" in which he states that he always admired Albert Einstein, but now he needs his help in his relationship problems.
On the seventh episode of Epic Rap Battles of History, Albert Einstein (portrayed by Zach Sherwin) faced off against Stephen Hawking (portrayed by series co-founder Nice Peter).
The song "Portrait (He Knew)" by Kansas is about Albert Einstein and his life.
The opera "Einstein on the Beach" by Philip Glass is one of Glass' trilogy of operas that portray people whose personal vision transformed the thinking of their times.

In typography

Albert Einstein's handwriting has been digitised as a font in an art project by typographer Harald Geisler and dancer Elizabeth Waterhouse. The font enables the user to write like Einstein on a computer or smartphone. The project was created in collaboration with the Albert Einstein Archives Jerusalem and presented 2015 on the crowdfunding platform Kickstarter where the campaign was supported by 2334 backers. Each letter of the font is based on Einstein's manuscripts, different variations of each letter are stored in the font and exchanged automatically during typing to create a natural look.

The Albert Einstein font was used to reenact the 1932 letter exchange between Einstein and Sigmund Freud. In 2017 at the 85th anniversary of the exchange, which was published in 1933 under the title "Why War", Harald Geisler presented the project on Kickstarter in collaboration with the Sigmund Freud Museum (Vienna) and the Albert Einstein Archives. Supporters of the project could choose to either receive the letters themselves or send them to politicians typeset in the handwriting of Einstein and Freud.

In video games
Einstein is an integral character in the Command & Conquer: Red Alert series, being responsible in Red Alert for altering the course of history using a time traveling device he created to remove Adolf Hitler from existence in an attempt to prevent the horrors of World War II, inadvertently leading to the Soviet Union's rise to power and conflict with Europe. He continues to be featured in the altered timeline in Red Alert and Red Alert 2 developing time travel technology for use by the Allies, and his fictional murder at the hands of the Soviets, also involving a time machine, is a central plot point of Red Alert 3.

In Mega Man, released in 1987, Dr. Wily's design is inspired by Albert Einstein, and was initially conceived to appear as a tall, thin scientist with a mustache, glasses, balding hair, and lab coat.

In Half-Life, one of the scientist models is based on Einstein's appearance.

See also
 Benjamin Franklin in popular culture
 Isaac Newton in popular culture
 List of things named after Albert Einstein
 Nikola Tesla in popular culture
 Thomas Edison in popular culture

References

External links
 About Princeton University copyright

Popular Culture